The Social Circle Historic District is a  historic district in Social Circle, Georgia.  It was listed on the National Register of Historic Places in 1980.  The listing included 200 contributing buildings.

It includes Greek Revival, Early Commercial, and Late Victorian architecture.

It includes the Social Circle Cotton Mill, built in 1901 and bricked up in 1972.

It includes the Josiah Clark Town House, believed to be the oldest building in Social Circle, a Plantation Plain or "I" House style building.

References

Historic districts on the National Register of Historic Places in Georgia (U.S. state)
National Register of Historic Places in Walton County, Georgia
Greek Revival architecture in Georgia (U.S. state)
Victorian architecture in Georgia (U.S. state)
Early Commercial architecture in the United States
Buildings and structures completed in 1840